The Monte I Gemelli (or Gemelli di Mologna) is an Alpine mountain located between Aosta Valley and  Piedmont (NW Italy).

Toponymy 
Literally Gemelli di Mologna means Twins of Mologna, where the Mologna is a stream tributary of the river Cervo. Twins refers to the fact that the mountain has a subsummit almost of the same elevation of its main summit.

Geography 

The mountain belongs to the Biellese Alps, a sub-range of Pennine Alps; the Colle della Mologna Grande, a pass at 2,356  m, divides it from the Punta Tre Vescovi, and the Colle della Mologna Piccola (2,208  m) from the nearby Punte Serange. The Gemelli di Mologna are located between Aosta and Cervo valleys.

SOIUSA classification 
According to the SOIUSA (International Standardized Mountain Subdivision of the Alps) the mountain can be classified in the following way:
 main part = Western Alps
 major sector = North Western Alps
 section = Pennine Alps
 subsection = Southern  Valsesia Alps
 supergroup = Alpi Biellesi
 group = Catena Tre Vescovi - Mars
 code = I/B-9.IV-A.1

Access to the summit

On the Gemelli di Mologna were opened some of the best known climbing routes of the Biellese. 
The hiking route follows the ridge connecting the summit with the Colle della Mologna Piccola; this mountain pass can be easily reached by a large and stone paved foothpath from Piedicavallo or from the Lys Valley.
On the  Cervo-Lys water divide also runs the Alta Via delle Alpi Biellesi, a long semi-alpinistic itinerary.

Mountain huts 
 Rifugio Rivetti

Maps
 Italian official cartography (Istituto Geografico Militare - IGM); on-line version: www.pcn.minambiente.it
 Provincia di Biella cartography: Carta dei sentieri della Provincia di Biella, 1:25.00 scale, 2004; on line version:  webgis.provincia.biella.it
 Carta dei sentieri e dei rifugi, 1:50.000 scale, nr. 9 Ivrea, Biella e Bassa Valle d'Aosta, Istituto Geografico Centrale - Torino

Bibliography

References
 

Mountains of Piedmont 
Mountains of Aosta Valley 
Mountains of the Biellese Alps 
Two-thousanders of Italy